Ready 2 Rumble: Revolution is the third and final game in the Ready 2 Rumble Boxing series, released in  North America on March 17, 2009, in Europe on March 20, 2009 and in Australia on March 26, 2009. Unlike the previous games developed by Midway, the third iteration was developed by AKI Corporation USA and produced by STEREO MODE under license from The Buffer Partnership. The game is distributed by Atari.

Reception 

The game was met with negative reception upon release, as GameRankings gave it a score of 39.06%, while Metacritic gave it 37 out of 100.

References

External links 
Ready 2 Rumble Revolution official site
 

2009 video games
Atari games
Boxing video games
Syn Sophia games
Wii-only games
Wii games
Multiplayer and single-player video games
Video games developed in the United States